The Hidroelektra workers massacre was the mass killing of 12 employees of the Yugoslavian (now Croatian) construction company Hidroelektra, which at the time was contracted to build a dam and a pipeline in Algeria.

Background 
The attack occurred as part of the Algerian Civil War, but was also connected with the Croat-Bosniak War, which had started earlier that year. The workers were near the end of a four-year contract and were due to leave Algeria in a few days.

Following the 1991 Algerian legislative election in which the Islamic Salvation Front won, the country descended into turmoil. Several foreign nationals were killed and a Hidroelektra warehouse in Algeria was burnt down. The Armed Islamic Group of Algeria demanded that all non-Muslim foreigners leave the country before December 15, 1993. One day before this deadline, the group stormed the camp where all the workers resided in Algeria. At that time, most of the workers had already left the camp, except for a group of 22 men who were still there.

Massacre 
According to a testimony from one of the survivors, the group of 50 assailants entered the camp through holes in the fence surrounding the encampment, sometime in the evening. The militants searched the barracks looking for workers and soon rounded up most of them. One worker remained hidden, while two workers were on a different location thus avoiding the incident. They then tied up the workers and looted them. 

Some of Hidroelektra's workers were Bosniaks, so the terrorists separated them from the rest of the group. They then tested the workers by asking them to pray in Arabic. Two of the Bosnian Croat workers successfully pretended that they were Muslims since they knew the prayers due to growing up alongside them.

One of the surviving workers recalled that after not knowing how to pray, he was taken to a different site where attackers threw him to the ground and slit his throat. He lost consciousness but remained alive as the executioner failed to cut his vital neck arteries. He claims that he pretended to be dead, but subsequently started to shiver due to shock. This resulted in an unknown person approaching him again and inflicting another deep cut, this time on the back side of his neck. Another worker had his face half-slashed, causing him to faint and making terrorists think that he was dead. Except for them, 12 other workers were put to death.

The surviving men were soon saved by the Algerian Army whose arrival routed the attackers. The injured men were then taken to a hospital where they received the necessary medical assistance.

Aftermath 
Following the massacre, the Croatian Government dispatched a delegation led by future prime minister Ivo Sanader, who was then a Deputy Foreign Affairs Minister. This delegation brought the surviving workers back to Croatia, as well as human remains of those who were killed.

References 

Kidnappings by Islamists
Kidnapped Croatian people
1993 in Algeria
1993 murders in Algeria